The Selwyn School is an independent, coeducational day school located in Argyle, Texas. Founded in 1957, the school educates grades Pre-Kindergarten through 12. An individualized, experiential approach to education is the cornerstone of a Selwyn education.

The school has an enrollment of over 100, primarily from Denton, but also from surrounding north Texas towns including Argyle, Aubrey, Corinth, Copper Canyon, Flower Mound, Highland Village and Sanger.

History

In 1955, Denton Civic Boys Choir School, was founded. But after two years a group of prominent Denton residents, led by John Ross of Moore Business Forms, put together a non-profit group to take over the school. With a borrowed $100, the school, renamed Denton Preparatory School in 1957, began classes in a building leased from Texas Woman's University. Thirty-three students attended kindergarten through 9th grade and it had five teachers. Leading that faculty was another Ross recruit: John D. Doncaster, a former English instructor at Southern Methodist University. Two years later Doncaster led the school to a new location to accommodate the 85 students and the fledgling boarding program. Parents and school community members worked to convert the barns into classrooms and the house into a dormitory.

Then J. Newton Rayzor stepped in. In 1961 Rayzor, a Houston developer and prominent landowner in Denton donated  of land to the school on University Drive (U.S. Route 380) west of town. In the fall of that year due to the labor of parents, faculty and students, the school was completed and ready for occupancy. To honor Rayzor, it was named after his daughter, Jeanne Selwyn Rayzor. (1926–1976).

Doncaster's educational philosophy rejected of progressive education favored at that time. His approach was traditional, epitomized by his phrase “discipline and the disciplines."

Over time the school became both a boarding and day school and it gained accreditation by the Texas Education Agency and the  Independent Schools Association of the Southwest a regional association of the National Association of Independent Schools. It also gradually added grades, eventually becoming a K-12 institution.

The 1970s and 1980s saw Doncaster making trips to the Middle East to encourage parents there to send their children to boarding school in Denton. At the time, Saudi Aramco (Arabian American Oil Company) would pay to send employees' children overseas to school. This led to a collection of students from all over: children of oil executives, international students, day students, and boarders from across the Southwest. This diversity led to the cosmopolitan atmosphere of the school.

As the 1980s drew to a close, the plummeting price of oil made recruitment difficult; oil wealth simply wasn’t there to pay the tuition of so many of its students. This was compounded by the recession dealt by 1991's Gulf War. The school as it stood then was unsustainable, so painful measures were taken: the upper school was closed. Despite cries from its small number of far-flung alumni, the move allowed the school to get on more solid financial footing by focusing on its local pre-K and kindergarten programs, even converting the girls dormitory into an extensive set of children's classrooms — including an indoor sandbox.

As attendance grew again, grades were added to accommodate demand, gradually building the middle school, and, eventually, in 2003, the reopening of the upper school beginning with the 9th grade and adding grades through the 12th.

Changes And Campus Move

On January 26, 2012, a fire destroyed the main building of the school, extensively damaging classrooms, offices, and destroying records. A fire marshal later determined it was arson.

A groundbreaking ceremony was held for a new building in May 2015, but in March 2016, the process was halted when fundraising goals weren't met. In May 2016, the school administration considered moving to a more central location when an anonymous donor made an offer.

On March 20, 2017, it moved to new campus on Copper Canyon Road in Argyle, Texas. A new pre-school building opened its doors in August, 2019, and an all-school "Selwyn Commons" was completed in September, 2019.

Curriculum

Over its history, retired university professors, experienced teachers at the middle and upper levels, and a solid Montessori atmosphere in the lower school made for a well-rounded education. Currently, the pre-school and kindergarten practice the Reggio Emilia philosophy of education, while modern, proven educational practices flourish throughout Lower, Middle and Upper School, delivered by an experienced faculty, over half of whom are Master teachers.

Throughout their matriculation at Selwyn School, students are educated and developed in keeping with the school's "Portrait Of A Selwyn Graduate." This set of principles, codified in 2018, summarize as:

 creative, confident, collaborative, thoughtful problem solving
 confident, adaptive resolve even during times of challenge or crisis
 commitment to community, relationship-building, with perspective informed locally and globally
 a gravitation toward leadership built on trust, collaboration and with a forward-thinking mentality
 character formed of knowledge, understanding, integrity, compassion, a commitment to truth and understanding in the face of differences

One of the things that sets Selwyn apart from other schools is its Perspectives program, an annual trip that is integrated into the curriculum. Younger students generally stay in-state, while middle school and upper school students venture further. Past trips have included excursions to Europe, Asia, Latin America, the Caribbean and throughout the United States. It is an opportunity for students to expand their horizons in a relatively structured way that builds on their curriculum and understanding of their world.

Since moving to the current Argyle campus, Outdoor Education has become a signature program at Selwyn. Always integral to the school, Outdoor Education now involves collaboration across the breadth of curriculum at each grade level. Experiential, project-based learning is at its core, exploring and learning about the world around us by exploring both our own multi-acre, wooded campus and other locales. The program puts theory into practice, allowing time for creativity and reflection to accelerate the learning process and cement these learned topics in the minds of its students.

References

External links
The Selwyn School website
 Handbook of Texas Online article

Educational institutions established in 1957
Independent Schools Association of the Southwest
Private K-12 schools in Texas
High schools in Denton County, Texas
1957 establishments in Texas